The 2012–13 Jacksonville Dolphins men's basketball team represented Jacksonville University during the 2012–13 NCAA Division I men's basketball season. The Dolphins were members of the Atlantic Sun Conference (A-Sun). They were led by head coach Cliff Warren, and played their home games in both the Veterans Memorial Arena and Swisher Gymnasium. They finished the season 14–18, 9–9 in A-Sun play to finish in a three way tie for fourth place. They lost in the quarterfinals of the Atlantic Sun tournament to USC Upstate.

Roster

Schedule
 
|-
!colspan=9| Regular season

|-
!colspan=9| 2013 Atlantic Sun men's basketball tournament

References

Jacksonville Dolphins men's basketball seasons
Jacksonville